Yuri Ivanovich Krinitsyn (Russian: Ю́рий Ива́нович Крини́цын, born 1938), known as The Riga Upyr, is a Soviet serial killer, robber and extortionist who, between January and September 1975, killed three people in Riga. His last would-be victim, whom he planned to blackmail, was famous composer Raimonds Pauls, who aided the authorities with Krinitsyn's capture. A psychological evaluation deemed that Krinitsyn was incompetent to stand trial, and he was interned at a mental hospital.

Biography 
Yuri Krinitsyn (or, according to other sources, Spitsyn) was born in Moscow, RSFSR in 1938. Later on his entire family moved to the Latvian SSR while he was still young. On August 13, 1950, the Krinitsyn family were among the passengers of the steamer Mayakovsky; the waiting crowd on the pier did not wait for passengers to leave, and started to board the ship. As a result, the steamer was not able to hold the load and sank due to passenger overcrowding. In a matter of minutes, 147  people perished, including Yuri Krinitsyn's parents, but he himself was rescued. However, as his brain had trouble receiving oxygen for a prolonged period before he could be resuscitated, this caused the young boy severe stress, which later on lead to him being diagnosed with reactive psychosis. As an adult, Krinitsyn found a job at the Bureau of Hydrodynamics in Riga and got married, but his new wife often cheated on and scolded him for his meager wage, despite him receiving a salary of 200 roubles, which was considered high by Soviet standards. In order to release tension, Krinitsyn bought a Luger pistol from a friend, with which he went out in the nearby Adazh forest to shoot at targets he positioned on trees.

Murders 
One time, while he had yet another quarrel with his wife, Krinitsyn went into the forest to blow off steam. While walking through the forest, he noticed a parked car in a clearing, with the driver sleeping inside. Suddenly, Krinitsyn attempted to shoot the driver, but his pistol misfired, causing him to hastily leave.

In January 1975, Krinitsyn got into the car of taxi driver Mekkers, a former spy for Nazi Germany who lived illegally in the country under a false name, having fled his homeland to escape being drafted into the army. Krinitsyn approached him and offered to take him to the forest, where he shot Mekkers in the back of the head. After killing him, he stole 20 Rbls. 63 kop., which he immediately spent on gifts for his wife. He then drove the man's car to Riga, where he left in a conspicuous place.

On September 14, Krinitsyn committed his next crime, killing a KGB operative named Markin, who worked for the Council of Ministers, by shooting him in the back of the head while he was walking along a forested path in Dārziņi. After discovering Markin's corpse, the investigators began to suspect that it was the work of foreign agents, since the bullets used were matched to a Luger, a foreign-made weapon. In fact, Krinitsyn was unaware of who his victim was.

Thirteen days later, Krinitsyn killed operative A. Serdechny, an employee of the army's counterilligence unit. He got into the victim's car and asked for a lift to Langstiņi, and on the way, he shot Serdechny in the back of the head. After killing him, he drove the car and parked it in front of an official KGB building in the capital's center, before promptly fleeing the scene.

Blackmail of Raimonds Pauls 
While waiting at a bus stop, Krinitsyn overheard a conversation between two women, who were discussing the material wealth of famous composer Raimonds Pauls. One of the women told her companion that for Pauls, 17,000 Rbls "amounted to 17 roubles for us", causing Krinitsyn to become infatuated with the idea of acquiring this exact sum from Pauls. He planned to first get the money and then kill the composer after, in order to become an infamous criminal.

On 24 December 1975, Krinitsyn phoned the Pauls residence and demanded the 17,000 Rbls from the composer, threatening that he would both him and his family members if he refused or notified authorities. He claimed that he had killed seven people so far, and said that Pauls would become his eight if he refused. After initially believing it was a prank call, Pauls eventually contacted an associate who worked in the police department who convinced to participate in an operation to catch the extortionist.

The following day, Pauls arrived at Mežaparks, carrying a briefcase which was boobytrapped with paint. He left the briefcase on the ground and quickly left, and a few minutes later, Krinitsyn arrived, checked the surrounding area, grabbed it and began to run. He ran into the entrance of a nearby apartment building, whereupon he opened the briefcase and was splashed with paint. A few moments later, he was detained by undercover operatives who were keeping him under surveillance.

During the subsequent interrogation, Krinitsyn denied his guilt in the extortion, claiming that he had found the briefcase by accident, and that his curiosity had gotten the better of him. However, Pauls recognized him after authorities played an audio recording of the extortionist's voice, which was recorded from his wiretapped phone. After he was confronted with this, Krinitsyn admitted to the extortion, as well as the three murders he had committed over the past months. According to him, he had killed Mekkers for "desecrating the forest"; Markin for looking back at him too much and Serdechny being asleep on the job. Krinitsyn showed the investigators where he kept his weapon, that being his shed near his wooden two-storey house on Karevue Street. While exploring the household, authorities found multiple pistols. Krinitsyn also claimed that he would spend hours upon hours in the shed, disassembling and maintaining his pistol.

Initially, Krinitsyn was deemed sane to stand trial, but during the process, his mental state grew worse at a rapid rate. He was sent for a psychiatric examination, which deemed that he was mentally unfit and thus, incapable of understanding the gravity of his actions. As a result, Krinitsyn was interned at a mental hospital, where, over the course of time, his condition deteriorated rapidly and he became unable to communicate verbally.

At present, Krinitsyn is being treated at the Chernyakhovsk Special Psychiatric Hospital in Chernyakhovsk, Russia. After the collapse of the Soviet Union, the Russian Ministry of Internal Affairs offered the government of newly independent Latvia to return the convict, but the offer was categorically refused.

See also
 List of serial killers by country

In popular culture 
 Documentary "Bullet for the Maestro" from "The investigation was conducted..." (in Russian)
 Documentary "Kill the composer" from "Legends of the Soviet Investigation" (in Russian)

Notes

References

Literature 
 F. Razzakov. Encyclopedia of Crime: Bandits from the Seventies. 2008. — 890 с. — . (in Russian)

1938 births
Living people
Male serial killers
People acquitted by reason of insanity
Criminals from Moscow
Robbers
Soviet criminals
Soviet serial killers